Elie Mystal Jr. (born May 10, 1978) is an American attorney, writer, and political commentator. He is the justice correspondent at The Nation, where he writes about the courts and the criminal justice system. Mystal has described himself as a liberal.

Early life and education 
Mystal is the son of Elie Mystal Sr., the first African American elected to the Suffolk County Legislature. He received a degree in government at Harvard College and a Juris Doctor degree from Harvard Law School.

Career 
Mystal is a former associate and litigator at the Debevoise & Plimpton law firm. He is a former executive editor of the Above the Law legal news website. He has made guest appearances on MSNBC and Sirius XM.

He is the author of Allow Me to Retort: A Black Guy's Guide to the Constitution, which is intended to be an "easily digestible argument about what rights we have, what rights Republicans are trying to take away, and how to stop them." Mystal's book, which was published by The New Press in March 2022, made The New York Times Best Seller list that same month.

As of 2022 he was a board member of Demand Justice, a liberal judicial advocacy group.

Views
Mystal has described himself as a liberal. He has been an outspoken supporter of civil rights, abortion rights, and legal rights and protections for gay, lesbian, bisexual, and transgender people.

In March 2022, he said the United States Constitution is "actually trash", pointing to the Fugitive Slave Clause and the Three-fifths Compromise. In the same interview, he said about the Constitution: "We act like this thing was kind of etched in stone by the finger of God, when actually it was hotly contested and debated, scrawled out over a couple of weeks in the summer in Philadelphia in 1787, with a bunch of rich, white politicians making deals with each other." Mystal has also described the founders of the United States as "racist, misogynist jerk-faces" and "sick, rapist bastards". Mystal described the United States as a "racist pariah state" in 2020. In 2021 he said the United States spreads "the myth of white exceptionalism" through its education system.

In August 2022, Mystal described Republican Senate nominee Herschel Walker as "what Republicans want from their Negroes" because he "so clearly doesn't have independent thoughts" and would "do what he's told" as a senator. Mystal rejected an invitation to "break bread" with Walker until "he talks to the Senator from Georgia Raphael Warnock about the actual issues affecting Georgia voters.”

Publications 
 Allow Me to Retort: A Black Guy's Guide to the Constitution. New York: The New Press. 2022. . .

References 

1978 births
American lawyers
American male journalists
American writers
Harvard College alumni
Harvard Law School alumni
Legal writers
Living people
The Nation (U.S. magazine) people
People associated with Debevoise & Plimpton
Political commentators